Antoine Marie Chamans, comte de Lavalette (14 October 176915 February 1830) was a French politician and general.

Biography

Early life
Born in Paris the same year as Napoleon Bonaparte, he spent the Revolution in the French Revolutionary Army, where he rose through the ranks to become an aide-de-camp to General Louis Baraguey d'Hilliers.

In 1796, after the Battle of the Bridge of Arcole, Baraguey d'Hilliers introduced his aide-de-camp to Napoleon, who was impressed enough to take him onto his personal staff and to entrust him with diplomatic missions. On 22 April 1798, Lavalette was married to Émilie de Beauharnais (1781–1855), niece of Napoléon's wife Joséphine.

Consulate and Empire
Lavalette returned to France with Napoleon, taking part in the latter's 18 Brumaire coup against the French Directory (1799). He occupied a number of offices in the French Consulate and First Empire, most notably eleven years as Minister of Posts, during which he oversaw the covert monitoring of the mail of suspected Royalists. On 27 November 1808, he was created a Count of the Empire.

Having rejected the opportunity to go into exile with Napoleon, because he had a pregnant wife and a 13-year-old daughter, he was arrested after the beginning of the Bourbon Restoration.  His wife had lost her pregnancy in October, and, on 21 November 1815, Lavalette was sentenced to execution by the Ultras.

Flight and exile
One night before his scheduled execution, he was visited by his wife and daughter Josephine (later the Baronne de Forget, who became the long-time mistress of Eugène Delacroix) and managed to change clothes and places with his wife, a ruse that was not discovered until the next morning. Having escaped prison, Lavalette made his way to Great Britain with the assistance of a small group of British soldiers, amongst whom were Robert Wilson and John Hely-Hutchinson. He then made his way to the United Kingdom of the Netherlands, and finally to Bavaria, where he had the support of Eugène de Beauharnais of his wife's family and his father-in-law Maximilian I Joseph of Bavaria. Madame Lavalette remained in prison until 23 January 1816.

Lavalette was able to return to France and died in 1830, most likely of lung cancer. He was buried at Père Lachaise Cemetery.

References

External links

  Biography

Counts of the First French Empire
French diplomats
French generals
Politicians from Paris
1769 births
1830 deaths
Grand Officiers of the Légion d'honneur
Burials at Père Lachaise Cemetery